During his presidency, Joe Biden, a Democrat, has seen multiple efforts by some members of the Republican Party to impeach him, as well as some further Republican calls for impeachment.

There has been no consensus among champions of impeachment as to what the root offenses for an impeachment should be. Issues that have been floated by prominent proponents have included Biden's handling of illegal immigration at the United States–Mexico border, the handling of the United States' withdrawal of troops from Afghanistan, Biden's extension of a federal COVID-19 eviction moratorium, other COVID-19 pandemic-related actions of Biden, business dealings of Biden's son Hunter (incorporating allegations of the Biden–Ukraine conspiracy theory), Biden's energy policy, and the Joe Biden classified documents incident. 

During the Democratic-controlled 117th United States Congress, Republican members submitted nine resolutions to impeach Biden. Expressed support for these resolutions, however, was limited among Republicans in the United States House of Representatives, as none of these resolutions had more than seven cosponsors, and a number had no cosponsors. More than half of the resolutions were submitted by Congresswoman Marjorie Taylor Greene, who submitted the first impeachment resolution on the first full day of Biden's presidency. Ahead of the 2022 United States House of Representatives elections, many news outlets predicted that impeachment might receive high priority from House Republicans if they retook the majority. However, after Republicans won a much weaker majority than many had predicted they would, many news outlets expected that the prospects of an impeachment were less likely. 

Some political commentators have characterized the desire to impeach Biden as being driven by resentment of many Republicans over the two impeachments of Biden's Republican predecessor, Donald Trump. There have also been some degree of efforts to impeach other Biden administration officials, including Vice President Kamala Harris, Secretary of Homeland Security Alejandro Mayorkas, and Secretary of State Antony Blinken.

Background
A desire to impeach Biden has been expressed by a number of influential members of the opposition Republican Party.

Some analysts have observed that, due to the two impeachments that Donald Trump faced in his presidency, many in the Republican Party have a desire to exact revenge on Democrats by impeaching a Democratic president.

Notable developments

Pre-inauguration 
Even before Biden won the Democratic Party's nomination in the 2020 United States presidential election, there was talk about how the Republican Party might impeach him if he became president. Joni Ernst, United States Senator from Iowa, in February 2020 remarked that the Biden–Ukraine conspiracy theory could be grounds "impeachable whatever".

Before Biden took office and shortly after the January 6, 2021 attack on the United States Capitol, Steve Bannon, the former chief strategist for Biden's predecessor Donald Trump, called for Biden to be impeached for, "his illegitimate activities of stealing the presidency," referring to unfounded conspiracy theories which formed the basis of attempts by Trump and his allies to overturn the results of the 2020 presidential election.

2021
On January 21, 2021, the day after the inauguration of Joe Biden, Rep. Marjorie Taylor Greene (R-GA) filed an article of impeachment against President Biden. Her articles related to the Biden–Ukraine conspiracy theory. Greene alleged abuse of power while Biden previously served as vice president of the United States. Her article of impeachment claimed that Viktor Shokin was investigating the founder of Burisma Holdings, a natural gas giant in Ukraine. Biden's son Hunter Biden had served as a member of the board since 2014. However, Shokin was not investigating the company. There is no concrete evidence that suggests Biden had pressured Ukraine to benefit his son. The day it was introduced, the article was referred to the House Committee on the Judiciary. On March 5, 2021, the article was referred to the Subcommittee on the Constitution, Civil Rights and Liberties. No further action has been taken on the article.

In June 2021, Donald Trump expressed interest in running for a House of Representatives seat in Florida in the 2022 House elections, getting himself elected Speaker of the House, and then beginning an impeachment inquiry against President Biden.

Following the withdrawal of American military forces from Afghanistan, the Fall of Kabul on August 15, 2021, and the subsequent attack on Kabul's airport, several Republicans, including Representatives Greene, Lauren Boebert, Ronny Jackson, and especially Senators Rick Scott and Lindsey Graham, called for either the stripping of Biden’s powers and duties via the 25th Amendment or removal of Biden from office via impeachment if Americans and allies were left behind and held hostage in Afghanistan by the Taliban. House Minority Leader Kevin McCarthy pledged a “day of reckoning” against Biden. Some Republicans, including Senators Josh Hawley and Marsha Blackburn, called for Vice President Kamala Harris and Biden’s other Cabinet officials to be removed as well. Mitch McConnell did not call for an impeachment inquiry against Biden, however, as Republicans did not have the majority in either the House or Senate.

On September 21, 2021, Republican Representative Bob Gibbs, with several cosponsors, introduced articles of impeachment related to the withdrawal from Afghanistan. Celine Castronuovo of The Hill opined that this resolution was not likely to fare better than Greene's previous impeachment resolution, but opined that it demonstrated, "how the introduction of articles of impeachment is becoming more common in today's polarized House". Also in September 2021, Republican Representative Lauren Boebert announced articles of impeachment against President Biden and Vice President Harris charging them with failing "to ensure the national security of the United States and its citizens" in the withdrawal of the United States military from Afghanistan.

2022
In January 2022, Republican Senator Ted Cruz of Texas predicted that if Republicans win control of the U.S. House of Representatives in the 2022 House of Representatives elections, they would likely to move to impeach Biden "whether it's justified or not". Hinting at retribution for the impeachments of Biden's Republican predecessor Donald Trump, Cruz used the phrase-of-speech, "what's good for the goose is good for the gander." Cruz speculated that matters concerning the United States border with Mexico would likely be the best grounds for impeachment.

In March 2022, Republican Representative Jim Jordan stated in an interview with The Washington Times that he believed his party should discuss the possibility of impeaching Biden, and that illegal immigration might be one of reasons to impeach Biden, but that an impeachment might focus on another matter entirely.

In September 2022, Republican Representative Nancy Mace characterized there being "pressure on Republicans," to impeach Biden if they won control of the House. In August 2022, Mike Lillis of The Hill likened early calls for impeachment by right-wing conservatives in the Republican Party to the early efforts to impeach Donald Trump, noting that, after Democrats took the House majority in the 2018 House elections, early calls by liberals on the Democratic Party's left were regularly rejected by House Speaker Nancy Pelosi until the tide turned after a whistleblower accused Trump of the acts that resulted in his first impeachment.

It has been noted that Republican calls for impeachment lacked a consensus on what the grounds for impeachment would be. Reasons Republican House members have floated for why to impeach Biden have included the withdrawal of the United States military from Afghanistan, illegal immigration and border enforcement, Biden's extension of a federal pandemic eviction moratorium, and various acts of the Biden administration regarding the COVID-19 pandemic.

By September 2022, nine impeachment resolutions against Biden had been introduced. Representative Marjorie Taylor Greene had authored five of them. Many of those sponsoring and cosponsoring these resolutions were members of the right-wing House Freedom Caucus. Reasons for impeachment cited by the nine resolutions varied. They included Biden's handling of illegal immigration at the United States-Mexico border, the handling of the United States' withdrawal from Afghanistan, the COVID-19 eviction moratorium, and Hunter Biden's business dealings. However, Oliver Knox of the Washington Post characterized the push to impeach Biden as "anemic" due to the fact that none of these had more than seven cosponsors, and some of them had no cosponsors. However, he also predicted that this could change if Republicans won a majority in the House of Representatives. He attributed the small support the resolutions had received, in part, to the fact that they would not likely amount to an impeachment while Democrats held majority control of the House of Representatives. Support for impeachment has been particularly prominent among many congresspeople associated with the House Freedom Caucus.

Ahead of the 2022 midterms, numerous prominent political analysts predicted that if the Republican Party won control of the House of Representatives for the 118th United States Congress, Biden might be impeached, as might other Biden administration officials such as Vice President Kamala Harris, Attorney General Merrick Garland, Secretary of Homeland Security Alejandro Mayorkas, and Secretary of State Antony Blinken, all of whom many House Republicans had expressed an open interest in impeaching. In addition to the nine articles of impeachment introduced against Biden by September 2022, by this time five other impeachment resolutions had been introduced against other members of his administration: two being against Attorney General Garland and the other three being against Vice President Harris, Secretary of State Blinken, and Secretary of Homeland Security Mayorkas. Discussions in Republican circles had also taken place before the midterms about the possibility of impeaching of Secretary of Education Miguel Cardona. Congressman David Schweikert had also proposed the idea of impeaching FBI Director Chris Wray.

Outlets such as The Hill predicated that an impeachment of Biden would be "a top priority" for House Republicans if they won control of the House of Representatives in the 2022 midterm elections. In early September 2022, a Rasmussen Reports poll found 52% of likely midterm voters to support impeachment. Shortly before the 2022 midterm elections, another Rasmussen Reports poll indicated that 54% of likely voters expected that, if Republicans won control of the House of Representatives, a Republican House would impeach Biden. The Biden administration even took steps that were potentially in preparation for investigations under a Republican congress, such as staffing a legal counsel office. As the election neared, many top members of the Republican Party, including House Minority Leader Kevin McCarthy, attempted to downplay discussion of impeaching Biden, perhaps fearing that it might put-off some voters.

After Republicans underperformed expectations in the midterm election and only won a very-narrow majority in the House of Representatives, some analysts began to express the belief that impeachment was less likely. However, it was still expected that other investigations into Biden and the Biden administrations would occur. Indeed, after their party secured a narrow majority in the House of Representatives, many leading Republicans expressed that investigations into Biden's presidential administration and into the business dealings of his son Hunter would be among their top priorities. Even after the party's underperformance in the midterm elections, many of the Donald Trump-aligned segment of the party's voter base of the Republican Party, as well as a number of congress members, continued pressuring House Republicans to pursue an impeachment of either Biden or a member of his presidential administration. A number of Republicans elected to the House publicly expressed reluctance to pursue an impeachment of Biden. A number of Senate Republicans also signaled their disinterest in seeing an impeachment of either Biden or a member of Biden's administration. On November 9, 2022, Biden commented on House Republican calls for investigations and impeachment, calling it, "almost comedy".

A Morning Consult poll in mid-November 2022 found that only 28% of Americans supporting having an impeachment investigation or investigations into Hunter Biden's business dealings be a top congressional priority, though it also found more than half of self-identified Republicans supported it as a top congressional priority. Overall, 39% of Americans supported impeachment being an important priority of any degree, while 43% opposed impeachment.

Following the Viktor Bout–Brittney Griner prisoner exchange on December 8, 2022, Congresswoman Marjorie Taylor Greene cited the exchange as another grounds upon which she believed that Biden should be impeached.

Andrew C. McCarthy of the National Review wrote a late-December op-ed arguing for Biden to be impeached over his policies in regard to the United States–Mexico border.

2023
On January 2, 2023, the day before the start of the 118th United States Congress, Representative Marjorie Taylor Greene continued to promote the prospect of impeachment. On January 7, 2023, Representative Byron Donalds declared his belief that an impeachment process against Biden is, "something that will happen." Representative Chip Roy also affirmed his desire to see an impeachment of Biden during the first days of the new Congress. On January 10, 2023, after news broke that a number of evidently-classified documents from Biden's tenure as Vice President had been found at the Penn Biden Center for Diplomacy and Global Engagement, Representative Greene cited this as a reason to impeach Biden. Republican Senator John Cornyn, when asked, told reporters that he did not believe that the Joe Biden classified documents incident rose to an impeachable offense. In the early weeks of the 118th Congress, Democratic House Minority Leader Hakeem Jeffries characterized Republicans as poised to spend the 118th Congress focusing on, "impeachment and investigation...[and] witch hunts," instead of focusing on concerns important to "working families".

Shortly after the 118th Congress began, former Representative Bob Barr, who, in the 1990s, had been a leading advocate of efforts to impeach then-president Bill Clinton, described the push to impeach Biden and other Biden administration officials as an "overreaction". Barr characterized impeachments as having become "devalued" into a "political tool", which he argued was a "misuse of impeachment". Barr urged caution on the part of Republicans regarding the pursuit of impeachments, noting that Democrats controlled the United States Senate. He instead encouraged using House committees to investigate aspects of the government.

Several Republicans that had, in the 117th Congress, supported legislation to impeach Biden have been chosen by the House Republican Caucus to be on the House Oversight Committee, including Lauren Boebert and Marjorie Taylor Greene.

Summary of impeachment resolutions

See also
Articles related to presidential impeachments and other efforts to impeach presidents of the United States:
James Buchanan
Impeachment inquiry against James Buchanan
Andrew Johnson
Efforts to impeach Andrew Johnson
First impeachment inquiry against Andrew Johnson
Second impeachment inquiry against Andrew Johnson
Impeachment of Andrew Johnson
Articles of impeachment adopted against Andrew Johnson
Impeachment trial of Andrew Johnson
1868 impeachment managers investigation
Timeline of the impeachment of Andrew Johnson
Richard Nixon
Impeachment process against Richard Nixon
Bill Clinton
Efforts to impeach Bill Clinton
Impeachment inquiry against Bill Clinton
Impeachment of Bill Clinton
Impeachment trial of Bill Clinton
George W. Bush
Efforts to impeach George W. Bush
Barack Obama
Efforts to impeach Barack Obama
Donald Trump
Efforts to impeach Donald Trump
Impeachment resolutions introduced against Donald Trump
Impeachment inquiry against Donald Trump
First impeachment of Donald Trump
First impeachment trial of Donald Trump
Second impeachment of Donald Trump
Second impeachment trial of Donald Trump

References

Biden, Joe
Presidency of Joe Biden
Impeachment
117th United States Congress